Marien may refer to:

Domkirche St. Marien (English: St. Mary's Cathedral), the modern Roman Catholic cathedral in Sankt Georg, Hamburg, Germany
Mariendom (Hamburg) (English: St. Mary's Cathedral), the ancient cathedral in Altstadt, Hamburg, Holy Roman Empire, demolished between 1804 and 1807
Mariendom (English: St. Mary's Cathedral), the Roman Catholic cathedral of Speyer, Palatinate, Germany
Marien Ngouabi University, the only state-funded university in the Republic of Congo
Saint-Marien, commune in the Creuse department in central France
Sankt Marien, municipality in the district Linz-Land in Upper Austria, Austria
Stade Joseph Marien, multi-use stadium in Brussels, Belgium, named after the sports administrator Joseph Marien (died 1933)

People 
Marien Tailhandier (1665–1738), soldier-surgeon after his arrival in Canada in 1685
Frank Marien (1890–1936), Australian editor of Smith's Weekly
Joseph Marien (1900–1950), Belgian Olympic runner
Marien Oulton Dreyer (1911–1980)
Marcel Mariën (1920–1993), Belgian surrealist (later Situationist), poet, essayist, photographer, collagist, filmmaker
Léopold Marien (1934–2018), former Belgian decathlete
Marien Ngouabi (or N'Gouabi, 1938–1977), military President of the Republic of the Congo from 1969 to 1977
Robert Marien (born 1955), Québécois (Canadian) actor, singer, and songwriter
Marien Michel Ngouabi (born 1980), Congolese former swimmer
Hanna Mariën (born 1982), Belgian sprinter who specializes in the 200 metres
Rudi Mariën, Belgian scientist and businessman

de:Mariën